Princess Royal Park is a public park and former major cricket venue in Arima, Trinidad and Tobago.

History
Located adjacent to the Arima Velodrome, the Park was originally named Arima Savannah. It was named for the Princess Royal by the mayor of Arima, Percy Cezair, during her visit to Trinidad and Tobago in 1962. The Park later hosted two first-class cricket matches for East Trinidad, the first in the semi-final of the 1970–71 Beaumont Cup against South Trinidad, with the second coming in the 1975–76 Texaco Cup against Central Trinidad. The Park has not played host to major cricket since the 1975–76 fixture.

Records

First-class
Highest team total: 254 all out by East Trinidad v South Trinidad, 1970–71
Lowest team total: 58 all out by East Trinidad v Central Trinidad, 1975–76
Highest individual innings: 84 by Alvin Corneal for East Trinidad v South Trinidad, 1970–71
Best bowling in an innings: 5-35 by Prince Bartholomew, as above
Best bowling in a match: 9-64 by Prince Bartholomew, as above

See also
List of cricket grounds in the West Indies

References

External links
Princess Royal Park at ESPNcricinfo

Arima
Cricket grounds in Trinidad and Tobago
Defunct cricket grounds in Trinidad and Tobago
Parks in Trinidad and Tobago